Federation of Malaya competed for the first time in the 1950 British Empire Games held in Auckland, New Zealand from 4 to 11 February 1950.

Medal summary

Medals by sport

Medallists

Athletics

Men
Track events

Field event

Key
Note–Ranks given for track events are within the athlete's heat only
Q = Qualified for the next round
q = Qualified for the next round as a fastest loser or, in field events, by position without achieving the qualifying target
NR = National record
N/A = Round not applicable for the event
Bye = Athlete not required to compete in round

Weightlifting

Men

References

Nations at the 1950 British Empire Games
1950 in Malayan sport
Malaysia at the Commonwealth Games